Waverley is a provincial electoral district (riding) in the Canadian province of Manitoba that came into effect at the 2019 Manitoba general election. It elects one member to the Legislative Assembly of Manitoba.

Created by the decennial provincial electoral redistribution of 2018, from parts of St. Norbert and Fort Whyte, the riding contains the southwest Winnipeg neighbourhoods of Waverley West, Waverley Heights, and part of Montcalm. It is bordered by the ridings of Fort Whyte and Fort Garry to the north, Fort Richmond to the east, Seine River to the south, and Midland to the west. All ridings adjacent to Waverley except for Midland are also in Winnipeg.

Election results

References

Manitoba provincial electoral districts
Politics of Winnipeg
Waverley West, Winnipeg